Hydrocyclones are a type of cyclonic separators that separate product phases mainly on basis of differences in gravity with aqueous solutions as the primary feed fluid.

As opposed to dry or dust cyclones, which separate solids from gasses, hydrocyclones separate solids or different phase fluids from the bulk fluid. A hydrocyclone comprises a cylindrical shaped feed part with tangential feed; an overflow part with vortex finder; a conical part with an apex. A cyclone has no moving parts.

Working principle 
Product is fed into the hydrocyclone tangentially under a certain pressure. This creates a centrifugal movement, pushing the heavier phase outward and downward alongside the wall of the conical part. The decreasing diameter in the conical part increases the speed and so enhances the separation. Finally, the concentrated solids are discharged through the apex. The vortex finder in the overflow part creates a fast rotating upward spiral movement of the fluid in the centre of the conically shaped housing. The fluid is discharged through the overflow outlet.

Cyclone parameters 
The following parameters are decisive for good cyclone operation:
the design
the specific weight difference between the two product phases
the shape of the solids
the speed of the feed
the density of the medium
the counter pressure at the overflow and apex

Areas of application 

The main areas of application for hydrocyclones are:

Mineral processing industry Hydrocyclones are frequently utilized in the metallurgical and mineral processing industry for the classification of fine particles and dewatering of slurries.
Starch industry Hydrocyclones are commonplace in the potato starch, cassava starch, wheat starch and corn starch industry for the concentration and refining of starch slurries.
The potato processing industry Hydrocyclones are used for the separation of starch from cutting water in the french fries and potato crisp and potato flakes industry
Sand separation and classification Hydrocyclones used for sand separation and classification  and as a separator of sand from water or sludge
Oil-water separation: Separation of oil and water in a.o. the offshore industry

Filters
Solid-gas separation
Waste treatment technology